Jabal Ghumaylah is a hill in Ras al-Khaimah.

References
Gazetteer of the United Arab Emirates. Washington, D.C. : Defense Mapping Agency, 1987.

Ghumaylah
Geography of the Emirate of Ras Al Khaimah